The 1975 Tour de Romandie was the 29th edition of the Tour de Romandie cycle race and was held from 6 May to 11 May 1975. The race started in Geneva and finished in Lancy. The race was won by Francisco Galdós.

General classification

References

1975
Tour de Romandie
Tour de Romandie
1975 Super Prestige Pernod